The Huitrera Formation is a geological formation in the Neuquén Basin in northern Patagonian Argentina whose strata date back to the Early Eocene of the Paleogene, or Casamayoran in the South American land mammal age classification.

Description 
The Huitrera Formation was first defined by Ravazzoli and Sesana in 1977. The name has been used to identify various volcaniclastic sequences, among others in the Ñirihuau fold-and-thrust belt. Part of the formation comprises andesites, dacitic and rhyolitic ignimbrites, volcanic breccias, tuffs and trachybasalts.

The formation was initially described as Late Eocene to Early Oligocene, but was later dated to 54.24 ± 0.45 Ma, meaning the Huitrera Formation is Ypresian, or in the SALMA classification, Casamayoran in age.

Fossil content 
The following macrofossils were reported from the formation:
 Birds
 Ueekenkcoracias
 Amphibians
 Llankibatrachus truebae
 Patagopipa corsolinii
 Insects
 Odonata
 Inacayalestes aikunhuapi
 Beetles
 Thesaurus punctatus (originally Catogenus)
 Flora
 Menispermites calderensis
 Raiguenrayun cura
 Cupressaceae indet.
 Podocarpaceae indet.
 Lauraceae indet.

The formation has also provided many pollen, analyzed in 2003 by Melendi et al.

See also 
 South American land mammal ages
 Laguna del Hunco Formation, contemporaneous fossiliferous formation of the Cañadón Asfalto Basin
 Itaboraí Formation, fossiliferous formation of the Itaboraí Basin of Brazil
 Bogotá Formation, contemporaneous fossil flora-bearing formation of central Colombia
 Green River Formation, contemporaneous fossiliferous formation of the central-western United States
 Klondike Mountain Formation, contemporaneous fossil flora-bearing formation of Washington State
 Messel pit, Eocene crater lake Lagerstätte of Germany

References

Bibliography 

  
  
   
  
 
 
 
  
 

Geologic formations of Argentina
Eocene Series of South America
Paleogene Argentina
Ypresian Stage
Casamayoran
Mudstone formations
Sandstone formations
Tuff formations
Lacustrine deposits
Formations
Fossiliferous stratigraphic units of South America
Paleontology in Argentina
Geology of Neuquén Province
Geology of Río Negro Province